Bulgaria first participated at the Olympic Games at the inaugural 1896 Games, with a single gymnast.  However, since Charles Champaud was a Swiss national living in Sofia, some sources credit his appearance to Switzerland instead.

The Bulgarian Olympic Committee was created in 1923 and first sent a team to the Summer Olympic Games in 1924. The nation has participated in every Summer Games since then, except for 1932 (during the Great Depression), 1948 (Bulgaria's role in World War II) and 1984 (part of the Soviet-led boycott of the 1984 Summer Olympics). Bulgaria first participated in the Winter Olympic Games in 1936 and has attended every Winter Games since then.

Bulgarian athletes have won a total of 230 medals, with wrestling and weightlifting as the top medal-producing sports. After the fall of the communist regime in 1989–90, in Bulgaria's turbulent transition to free-market democracy, top-notch state support for Bulgarian Olympians disintegrated. Diminishing and marginalized medal returns were evident in the 2012 London Olympics, where Bulgaria, a former top-10 Olympic power in the late 1980s, fell out of its original high stature. Bulgaria's best performance to date has come in the 1980 Summer Olympics where they finished third in the medal table. In the 1988 Summer Olympics Bulgaria ranked 7th, but won the nation's largest total of gold medals to date. Bulgaria's most successful Winter Olympics took place in 1998, where the country ranked 15th in the medal table.

Medal tables

Medals by Summer Games

Medals by Winter Games

Medals by summer sport

Medals by winter sport

List of medalists

Summer Olympics

Winter Olympics

Medals by sport and year

Summer Olympics

Athletics

Basketball

Boxing

Canoeing

Equestrian

Football

Gymnastics

Judo

Karate

Rowing

Shooting

Swimming

Tennis

Volleyball

Weightlifting

Wrestling

Winter Olympics

Biathlon

Cross-country skiing

Short track speed skating

Bulgarian Olympic Flag Bearers

See also
 List of flag bearers for Bulgaria at the Olympics
 :Category:Olympic competitors for Bulgaria
 Bulgaria at the Paralympics

External links